HLT may refer to:

Computing 
 HLT  (x86 instruction)
 Human language technology

Places 
 Hamilton Airport (Victoria), Australia
 Harrah's Lake Tahoe, a casino hotel in Stateline, Nevada, United States
 Harveys Lake Tahoe, another casino hotel in Stateline

Other uses 
 Hilton Worldwide, a hospitality business
 Nga La language, spoken in Burma (ISO 639-3: hlt)
 Hurricane Liaison Team of the United States National Hurricane Center

See also 
 Halt (disambiguation)